Gabriel Alejandro Sanabria (born 2 July 1992) is an Argentine professional footballer who plays as an attacking midfielder for Tristán Suárez.

Career
Sanabria started with Primera B Metropolitana side Atlanta during 2010–11, a season that Atlanta finished with promotion into the 2011–12 Primera B Nacional but were relegated back to Primera B Metropolitana at the first time of asking. During this time, Sanabria made thirty appearances for the club and scored three goals. Sanabria then departed Atlanta to join Torneo Argentino B club Gutiérrez before going onto join Villa Dálmine of Primera B Metropolitana. Across two seasons with Villa Dálmine, he scored three goals in thirty-seven games in the third tier. In January 2016, Sanabria joined Primera División club Arsenal de Sarandí.

He made his top-flight Argentine debut on 12 February against Banfield. In July 2017, Sanabria was released by Arsenal. On 5 August, Sanabria joined second tier team Los Andes on a free transfer. His Los Andes debut came on 15 September in a goalless draw against Deportivo Morón. On 26 November, Sanabria made his 100th career appearance versus Estudiantes. In January 2018, Sanabria signed for fellow Primera B Nacional side Sarmiento. He scored on his first appearance, netting the club's fourth goal in an away win against Flandria. In July 2019, Sanabria headed to Greece with Levadiakos of Super League 2.

Sanabria's first goal for Levadiakos came during his first match, which was a 3–2 loss away to Platanias on 29 September. His contract was terminated in December. Sanabria subsequently returned to Argentina with Tristán Suárez. He made his debut on 1 February 2020 against UAI Urquiza, prior to scoring twice in his next appearance versus Almirante Brown.

Career statistics
.

References

External links

1992 births
Living people
Sportspeople from Lanús
Argentine footballers
Association football midfielders
Argentine expatriate footballers
Expatriate footballers in Greece
Argentine expatriate sportspeople in Greece
Primera B Metropolitana players
Primera Nacional players
Argentine Primera División players
Super League Greece 2 players
Club Atlético Atlanta footballers
Villa Dálmine footballers
Arsenal de Sarandí footballers
Club Atlético Los Andes footballers
Club Atlético Sarmiento footballers
Levadiakos F.C. players
CSyD Tristán Suárez footballers